Khera Dabar is a village located in Najafgarh tehsil of South West Delhi, Delhi.

Notability 
Chaudhary Brahm Prakash Ayurved Charak Sansthan is situated in this village that is Asia's largest ayurvedic hospital.

Transport 

BUS NO.-826 

It can be reached by BUS ROUTE NO.826 runs between Tilak Nagar- Ch. Brahm Prakash Ayurvedic hospital, khera Dabar via Uttam Nagar,  Dwarka Mor,  Najafgarh.

Pincode
Pincode of Kheda Dabar (or Khera Dabar) : 110073

References

Villages in South West Delhi district